Emil Králíček (11 October 1877 – 26 March 1930) was a Czech architect.  

Králíček studied at Prague Industrial Arts School and in the offices of Antonin Balsanek in Prague and Joseph Maria Olbrich in Darmstadt.  He began designing in Prague around 1900 in the office of Matěj Blecha, and worked in the styles of classicism, Art Nouveau, Czech Cubism and Czech Rondocubism successively.  Beginning as draftsman Králíček worked himself into a position of project manager, and developed collaborations with a number of Czech sculptors like Celda Klouček, Antonín Waigant and Karel Pavlík.  

Králíček started his own office in 1920, and committed suicide ten years afterward.

Projects
Work includes:  

 Hotel Zlatá Husa, Wenceslas Square in Prague, with Matěj Blecha, 1909-1910
 Adam Pharmacy, at #8 Wenceslas Square, with Blecha, 1911-1913
 the Diamant House in Prague, with Blecha, 1912-1913
 Šupich Building, now the Moravian Bank, Wenceslas Square, possible attribution with Blecha

Gallery

External links
 Short English-language biography

Sources  
 LUKEŠ, Zdeněk. Lampa, která předběhla dobu. Lidové noviny. 10. 4. 2010, s. 31. ISSN 0862-5921.
 LUKEŠ, Zdeněk. Emil Králíček : zapomenutý mistr secese a kubismu. Praha: Galerie Jaroslava Fragnera, 2004. . (česky, deutsch)
 KOHOUT, Michal; TEMPL, Stephan; ŠLAPETA, Vladimír. In: Praha : Architektura XX. století. Praha: Zlatý řez, 1998 (2. vydání). .
 ŠVÁCHA, Rostislav. Od moderny k funkcionalismu: Proměny pražské architektury 1. poloviny 20. století. Praha: Victoria Publishing, 1994 (2. vydání). .
 LUKEŠ, Zdeněk. Emil Králíček. Zlatý řez. Leden 1993, čís. 3, s. 6-11. ISSN 1210-4760.
 LUKEŠ, Zdeněk; SVOBODA, Jan E. Architekt E. Králíček - zapomenutý zjev české secese a kubismu. Umění. 1984, roč. 32, čís. 5, s. 441-449. ISSN 1804-6509. (česky, německé resumé)

References

Czech architects
1877 births
1930 deaths
Art Nouveau architects
1930 suicides